The 1937 LSU Tigers football team represented Louisiana State University (LSU) in the 1937 college football season.

Schedule

Rice
The Tigers traveled to Houston to face Rice. LSU picked up their third consecutive shutout of the season in a 13–0 victory. It also marked the longest fumble recovery returned for a touchdown in LSU history when Ken Kavanaugh scooped up a Rice fumble and returned it 100 yards for the score.

References

LSU
LSU Tigers football seasons
LSU Tigers football